The Clean Up is a 1929 American silent drama film directed by Bernard McEveety and starring Charles Delaney, Betty Blake and Bruce Gordon.

A newspaperman and a cop join forces to clean up a city of its criminal elements.

Cast
 Charles Delaney as Oliver Brooks 
 Betty Blake as Susan Clancy 
 Bruce Gordon as Hard Boiled Foley 
 Lewis Sargent as Hunch 
 Harry Myers as Jimmy 
 J.P. McGowan as Frank Lawrence 
 Charles H. Hickman as Captain Clancy

References

Bibliography
 Munden, Kenneth White. The American Film Institute Catalog of Motion Pictures Produced in the United States, Part 1. University of California Press, 1997.

External links

1929 films
1929 drama films
Silent American drama films
Films directed by Bernard McEveety
American silent feature films
1920s English-language films
American black-and-white films
1920s American films